Francesco Gaeta or Francesco Caieta (1605 – 2 March 1669) was a Roman Catholic prelate who served as Bishop of Bitetto (1655–1669).

Biography
Francesco Gaeta was born in Salerno, Italy in 1605. On 30 August 1655, he was appointed during the papacy of Pope Alexander VII as Bishop of Bitetto. On 14 September 1655, he was consecrated bishop by Giulio Cesare Sacchetti, Cardinal-Bishop of Frascati, with Giovanni Alfonso Puccinelli, Archbishop of Manfredonia, and Francesco Gheri, Bishop of Cervia, serving as co-consecrators. He served as Bishop of Bitetto until his death on 2 March 1669.

See also 
Catholic Church in Italy

References 

17th-century Italian Roman Catholic bishops
Bishops appointed by Pope Alexander VII
1605 births
1669 deaths